Grantas Vasiliauskas (born January 10, 1999, in Alytus) is a Lithuanian professional basketball player for Lietkabelis Panevėžys of the Lithuanian Basketball League.

Playing career
In 2015, Vasiliauskas participated in the prestigious Adidas Eurocamp in Treviso, Italy.

In 2016, he participated in the Basketball Without Borders camp in Lohja, Finland, along with his junior squads teammates Arnas Velička, Ignas Sargiūnas and Lukas Uleckas.

In September, 2016, he signed a long-term deal with the Lithuanian powerhouse Žalgiris Kaunas.

National team career
Vasiliauskas has actively represented Lithuania junior teams on the international stage and won medals multiple times.

References

External links
 Profile at eurobasket.com

Living people
1999 births
BC Nevėžis players
BC Žalgiris-2 players
Lithuanian expatriate basketball people in Estonia
Lithuanian men's basketball players
Small forwards
University of Tartu basketball team players